John D. Fuller is an American educator and politician in Montana. Fuller is a Republican member of Montana House of Representatives for District 8.

Education 
Fuller earned a Bachelor of Arts degree from Northern Illinois University. Fuller earned a Master of Science degree in Education from National Louis University.

Career 
Fuller served in the United States Army from 1967 until 1971. 
Fuller is a Vietnam veteran who obtained the rank of Staff Sergeant.

In 1972, Fuller became a high school teacher at Wheaton Central High School in  Wheaton, Illinois. Fuller was also a wrestling head coach at Wheaton Central High School. In 1996, Fuller became a high school teacher at Flathead High School in Kalispell, Montana until 2009. In 2001, Fuller served as a member of the Montana State Board of Public Education, until 2008.

On November 6, 2018, Fuller won the election and became a Republican member of Montana House of Representatives for District 8. Fuller defeated Sid Daoud with 68.65% of the votes.

Fuller serves as the chairman of Flathead County Republican Party Central Committee in Montana.

In a February 2022 op-ed for the Flathead Beacon, Fuller wrote that "[d]emocracy is a methodology of government that has failed as miserably as socialism."

Personal life 
Fuller's wife is Cynthia Fuller. They have one son. Fuller and his family live in Whitefish, Montana.

See also 
 Montana House of Representatives, District 8

References

External links 
 John Fuller
 John Fuller at ballotpedia.org
 John Fuller at leg.mt.gov
 John Fuller Calls for Unity in Montana’s Republican Party at excellenceinvoting.org (2019)
 Possible contested legislative primaries in the Flathead at flatheadmemo.com (January 9, 2020)

Living people
Republican Party members of the Montana House of Representatives
21st-century American politicians
Northern Illinois University alumni
National Louis University alumni
Politicians from Kalispell, Montana
People from Kalispell, Montana
People from Wheaton, Illinois
Year of birth missing (living people)